Nazrul Mancha (Bengali: নজরুল মঞ্চ) is an auditorium in Kolkata, India. Named after Bengali poet Kazi Nazrul Islam, the auditorium is notably used as the venue for the Dover Lane Music Conference in January each year, where audiences enjoy musical performances for four consecutive nights.

In 2012, the Finnish band Poets of the Fall performed at Nazrul Mancha during its Temple of Thought tour in India.

References

External links
Description of Nazrul Mancha
Reference to programme schedule at Nazrul Mancha, Dover Lane
Official website of Dover Lane Music Conference
Nazrul Mancha in Wikimapia

Auditoriums in Kolkata